Elizabeth Susan Koshy, (born May 10, 1994) is an Indian shooter from Kerala.

Career
Koshy made her international debut at the Junior meet in Germany in 2011 in which the Indian team was in sixth place. Koshy won five gold medals in Thiruvananthapuram at the State championship in the same year. She won silver in the Asian Shooting Championships and represented India in the 2013 and 2014 World Cups. Koshy took part in the 2014 Glasgow Commonwealth Games. Koshy won gold in the 2015 National Games women's 50m Rifle Prone event, the first for Kerala. She was coached by Haryana-based Satguru Dass from the navy. From Kochi, she was inspired to take up the sport on seeing a pre-National shooting championship during her childhood; she said that her grandfather was a hunter. She has taken part in prone, three-position and air rifle events but prefers three-position.

References

1994 births
Indian female sport shooters
Sport shooters from Kerala
Living people
Shooters at the 2014 Commonwealth Games
Commonwealth Games competitors for India
Sportspeople from Kochi
Sportswomen from Kerala
21st-century Indian women
21st-century Indian people
South Asian Games gold medalists for India
South Asian Games silver medalists for India
South Asian Games medalists in shooting
St. Teresa's College alumni